Tarundia is a union of Ishwarganj Upazila, Mymensingh District, Mymensingh Division in Bangladesh. Border area cover in the western side is Vangnamari Union, in the northern side Douhakhola Union, in the eastern side is Barahit Union and in the southern side is Uchakhila Union. Villages of this union are Tarundia, Mirzapur, Matikhola, Dhopakhola, Balihata, Gowalpara, Golla, Taherpur, Konapara, Shakua, Shartaj Bahera, Nagaryatrapur, Kazir Bahera, Jhithor, Gaborboalia, Purabaria, Indrajitkhola, Begunbari and so on.

Geographical location
This Union is situated on the bank of Swine river and Koila/Kalia Bill.

Education
There are many educational institutions in this union.
 Tarundia Jagat Memorial High School
 Konapara High School
 Shakua Adarsh Bidya Niketon
 Purabaria High School
 Golla Alia Madrasha (Boys)
 Golla Alia Madrasha (Girls)
 Tarundia Government Primary School
 Taherpur Government Primary School
 Dhopakhola Government Primary School
 Shakua Government Primary School
 Polash Kanda Government Primary School

References

External links
 mindat.org, retrieved 13 November 2019
 weathercrave.com,  retrieved 13 November 2019

Unions of Ishwarganj Upazila
Populated places in Mymensingh Division